Benjamin Husaby (born December 26, 1965) is an American cross-country skier. He competed at the 1992 Winter Olympics and the 1994 Winter Olympics.

References

External links
 

1965 births
Living people
American male cross-country skiers
Olympic cross-country skiers of the United States
Cross-country skiers at the 1992 Winter Olympics
Cross-country skiers at the 1994 Winter Olympics
People from Eden Prairie, Minnesota